Hexenuronic acid (HexA) is a bicyclic organic compound with the formula C13H20O10. It is an unsaturated sugar produced during the kraft process in the creation of wood pulp.

Kraft process 
During the kraft process, which is the turning of wood into wood pulp for papermaking, wood chips are treated with sodium hydroxide and sodium sulfide. Sodium hydroxide catalyzes the demethylation of 4-O-methyl-D-glucuronoxylan, which is found at the ends of the polysaccharide xylan.

Hexenuronic acid decreases a wood's kappa number, which is a measure of bleachability of wood pulp, by 3-7. It readily reacts with common wood pulp bleaching agents like ozone, peracetic acid, and chlorine dioxide. Consequently, research has focused on ways to break down hexenuronic acid prior to bleaching to decrease dangerous waste products and costs.

The main method of destroying hexenuronic acid is to treat the wood pulp post kraft processing with strong acids at high temperatures. HexA is hydrolyzed and broken down into aldehydes and alcohols like 2-furoic acid and 5-carboxy-2-furaldehdye. This process has led to a 50% reduction in bleaching costs of the wood pulp in some cases.

In microbes 
Polysaccharide lyases (PL) are a type of enzyme that is found in numerous microorganisms including bacteriophages that break down parts of wood. PL catalyzses β-elimination of uronic acid-containing polysaccharides into HexA.

References 

Papermaking
Oxygen heterocycles
Carboxylic acids
Methoxy compounds
Sugar acids